Son Hatten was an American Negro league third baseman in the 1910s.

Hatten played for the Kansas City Royal Giants in 1911. In three recorded games, he posted one hit in 11 plate appearances.

References

External links
Baseball statistics and player information from Baseball-Reference Black Baseball Stats and Seamheads

Year of birth missing
Year of death missing
Place of birth missing
Place of death missing
Kansas City Royal Giants players
Baseball third basemen